The Simulation Model Portability is a standard for simulation models developed by ESA together with various stakeholders in the European Space Industry.

The first version, also known as SMI standard, was implemented in SIMSAT and EuroSim, simulator infrastructures in use at various ESA locations.
The second version, also known as Simulation Modelling Platform - SMP2, is currently at version 1.2.

The ECSS has now taken the lead for further iterations of the SMP2 standard. At first, it has been published as a Technical Memorandum ECSS-E-TM-40-07 and in 2020 it become the ECSS standard ECSS-E-ST-40-07.

References
Simulation Model Portability
SMP implementation in Eurosim
Presentation at the 6th NASA/ESA Workshop on product exchange
25 January 2011: ECSS-E-TM-40-07 "Simulation modelling platform" made available

European Space Agency